Ance is a Latvian feminine given name. The associated name day is July 26.

Notable people named Ance
 Ance Priede (born 1983), Latvian actress
 Ance Priedniece (born 1997), Latvian photographer

References 

Latvian feminine given names
Feminine given names